Santipap Ratniyorm (born September 4, 1992) is a Thai professional footballer who plays as an attacking midfielder for Thai League 1 club Lamphun Warriors.

Honours

Club
Muangthong United
 Thai League 1 
  Champions (1) : 2010
 Kor Royal Cup 
  Winners (1) : 2010

References

External links

1992 births
Living people
Santipap Ratniyorm
Santipap Ratniyorm
Association football midfielders
Santipap Ratniyorm
Santipap Ratniyorm
Santipap Ratniyorm
Santipap Ratniyorm